Stearoyl-CoA is a coenzyme involved in the metabolism of fatty acids. Stearoyl-CoA is an 18-carbon long fatty acyl-CoA chain that participates in an unsaturation reaction. The reaction is catalyzed by the enzyme stearoyl-CoA desaturase, which is located in the endoplasmic reticulum. It forms a cis-double bond between the ninth and tenth carbons within the chain to form the product oleoyl-CoA.

References

Bibliography 

Metabolism
Thioesters of coenzyme A